Crash Pad is a 2017 American comedy film directed by Kevin Tent, from a screenplay by Jeremy Catalino. It stars Domhnall Gleeson, Christina Applegate, Thomas Haden Church and Nina Dobrev.

It was released through video on demand on September 25, 2017, before opening in a limited release on October 27, 2017, by Destination Films and Vertical Entertainment.

Plot
A hopeless romantic thinks he's found true love with an older woman, only to learn that she's married and that his fling is merely an instrument of revenge against her neglectful husband.

Cast
 Domhnall Gleeson as Stensland
 Thomas Haden Church as Grady Dott
 Christina Applegate as Morgan Dott
 Nina Dobrev as Hannah
 Dan Gill as Lyle
 James Yi as Mr. Laframboise
 Balinder Johal as Muumuu
 Britt Irvin as Carrie
 Anna Van Hooft as Samantha
 Anja Savcic as Peggy the Pony Snuggler
 Aliyah O'Brien as Female Bartender
 Julian Christopher as Billy Ocean

Production
In October 2015, it was announced Domhnall Gleeson, Christina Applegate, Thomas Haden Church and Nina Dobrev had been cast in the film, with Kevin Tent making his directorial debut from a screenplay by Jeremy Catalino. Alexander Payne will serve as an executive producer on the film, alongside William Horberg, Lauren Bratman, Dominic Ianno, Jon Ferro, Stuart Pollok, Joseph McKelheer, Bill Kiely, and Vicki Sotheran under their Wonderful Films, Indomitable Entertainment, Windowseat Entertainment and Sodona Entertainment banners respectively.

Release
The film was released through video on demand on September 25, 2017, before opening in a limited release on October 27, 2017, by Vertical Entertainment and Destination Films.

Critical reception
Crash Pad received mixed reviews from film critics. It holds a 54% approval rating on review aggregator website Rotten Tomatoes, based on 13 reviews, with a weighted average of 5.07/10. On Metacritic, the film holds a rating of 46 out of 100, based on 5 critics, indicating "mixed or average reviews".

References

External links
 
 

2017 films
American comedy films
Destination Films films
Films shot in British Columbia
Vertical Entertainment films
Films scored by Rolfe Kent
2017 directorial debut films
2010s English-language films
2010s American films